The 2022 Houston Dynamo season was the 17th season of the team's existence since joining Major League Soccer (MLS) prior to the 2006 season.  It was the first season with head coach Paulo Nagamura, who was hired on January 3.  2022 was the Dynamo's first full season under General Manager Pat Onstad, who was hired with 1 game remaining in the 2021 season. Asher Mendelsohn was hired as technical director on January 3.

On January 18, the Dynamo made the most expensive signing in club history, signing Paraguayan striker Sebastián Ferreira from Club Libertad.  On March 2, the Dynamo made the highest-profile transfer in club history, signing Mexican international Héctor Herrera from Atlético Madrid to a pre-contract agreement.

On September 5, with the team last in the Western Conference through 29 games and having just 2 wins in the last 13 games, Paulo Nagamura was fired as head coach.  Dynamo 2 head coach Kenny Bundy was named interim head coach for the final 5 games, playing to a 2-2-1 record.  The Dynamo ended the season 13th in the conference, missing the playoffs for the 5th consecutive season and the 8th time in 9 years.

On the front office end, it was Ted Segal's second season (first full season) as majority owner and John Walker's fourth and final season as President of Business Operations.  On June 14, Walker announced he would step down following the season.  On August 25, Ted Segal bought the remaining shares owned by Oscar De La Hoya, Gabriel Brener, and Ben Guill.  Lyle Ayes also joined the ownership group

Current squad 

Appearances and goals are totals for MLS regular season only.

Player movement

In 
Per Major League Soccer and club policies terms of the deals do not get disclosed.

Out

Loans out

MLS SuperDraft

Coaching staff

Non-competitive

Preseason

Competitions

Major League Soccer

Standings

Western Conference

Overall

Results summary

Results by round

Match results

U.S. Open Cup

Season statistics

Appearances, goals, assists, and cards 
{| class="wikitable sortable" style="text-align:center;"
|+
! rowspan="2" |No.
! rowspan="2" |Pos
! rowspan="2" |Nat
! rowspan="2" |Player
! colspan="5" |Total
! colspan="5" |MLS
! colspan="5" |Open Cup
|-
!!!!!!!style="width:10px;"|!!style="width:10px;"|!!!!!!!!style="width:10px;"|!!style="width:10px;"|!!!!!!!!style="width:10px;"|!!style="width:10px;"|
|-
|2||DF||||align=left|Daniel Steres||19||2||1||6||0||18||2||1||6||0||1||0||0||0||0
|-
|3||DF||||align=left|Adam Lundqvist||31||0||5||5||1||31||0||5||5||1||0||0||0||0||0
|-
|4||DF||||align=left|Zarek Valentin||7||0||0||0||0||5||0||0||0||0||2||0||0||0||0
|-
|5||DF||||align=left|Tim Parker||29||0||0||5||0||28||0||0||5||0||1||0||0||0||0
|-
|7||FW||||align=left|Thiago Fernandes||5||0||0||0||0||3||0||0||0||0||2||0||0||0||0
|-
|8||MF||||align=left|Memo Rodríguez||33||0||3||6||0||30||0||3||6||0||3||0||0||0||0
|-
|9||FW||||align=left|Sebastián Ferreira||32||14||3||2||0||31||13||3||2||0||1||1||0||0||0
|-
|10||MF||||align=left|Fafà Picault||32||7||3||6||0||30||7||3||5||0||2||0||0||1||0
|-
|11||FW||||align=left|Corey Baird||25||3||4||1||0||23||2||4||1||0||2||1||0||0||0
|-
|12||FW||||align=left|Steve Clark||33||0||0||2||0||33||0||0||2||0||0||0||0||0||0
|-
|13||DF||||align=left|Ethan Bartlow||17||0||0||2||0||15||0||0||2||0||2||0||0||0||0
|-
|16||MF||||align=left|Héctor Herrera||10||0||1||3||0||10||0||1||3||0||0||0||0||0||0
|-
|17||DF||||align=left|Teenage Hadebe||23||2||0||10||2||22||2||0||10||2||1||0||0||0||0
|-
|17||FW||||align=left|Nico Lemoine||0||0||0||0||0||0||0||0||0||0||0||0||0||0||0
|-
|19||FW||||align=left|Tyler Pasher||20||2||1||0||0||17||2||1||0||0||3||0||0||0||0
|-
|20||MF||||align=left|Adalberto Carrasquilla||33||2||4||8||1||32||2||4||8||1||1||0||0||0||0
|-
|21||MF||||align=left|Derrick Jones||0||0||0||0||0||0||0||0||0||0||0||0||0||0||0
|-
|21||FW||||align=left|Nelson Quiñónes||8||0||0||0||0||8||0||0||0||0||0||0||0||0||0
|-
|22||MF||||align=left|Matías Vera||29||0||2||7||1||28||0||2||7||1||1||0||0||0||0
|-
|23||FW||||align=left|Darwin Quintero||32||8||6||5||0||31||8||5||4||0||1||0||1||0||0
|-
|24||MF||||align=left|Darwin Cerén||30||0||1||9||1||27||0||1||8||1||3||0||0||1||0
|-
|25||MF||||align=left|Griffin Dorsey||29||1||3||8||0||27||1||3||7||0||2||0||0||1||0
|-
|26||GK||||align=left|Michael Nelson||5||0||0||0||0||2||0||0||0||0||3||0||0||0||0
|-
|27||MF||||align=left|Marcelo Palomino||4||0||0||0||0||2||0||0||0||0||2||0||0||0||0
|-
|29||DF||||align=left|Sam Junqua||18||1||2||0||0||15||0||1||0||0||3||1||1||0||0
|-
|30||MF||||align=left|Ian Hoffmann||0||0||0||0||0||0||0||0||0||0||0||0||0||0||0
|-
|32||MF||||align=left|Juan Castilla||2||0||0||2||0||1||0||0||1||0||1||0||0||1||0
|-
|33||FW||||align=left|Danny Ríos||0||0||0||0||0||0||0||0||0||0||0||0||0||0||0
|-
|34||FW||||align=left|Thorleifur Úlfarsson||33||4||1||3||0||31||4||1||3||0||2||0||0||0||0
|-
|35||FW||||align=left|Brooklyn Raines||4||0||0||0||0||1||0||0||0||0||3||0||0||0||0
|-
|37||DF||||align=left|Zeca ||21||0||1||3||0||20||0||1||3||0||1||0||0||0||0
|-
|38||GK||||align=left|Xavier Valdez||0||0||0||0||0||0||0||0||0||0||0||0||0||0||0
|-
|45||FW||||align=left|Beto Avila||11||0||2||3||0||8||0||1||3||0||3||0||1||0||0
|-
|57||DF||||align=left|Micael||1||0||0||1||1||0||0||1||0||0||0||0||0||0||0

Clean sheets 
{| class="wikitable" style="text-align:center;"
|+
!!!!!Player!!width=60|MLS!!width=60|Open Cup!!width=60|Total
|-
|12||||Steve Clark||6||0
!6
|-
|26||||Michael Nelson||0||1
!1
|-
! colspan="3" |Total!!6!!1!!7

Honors and awards

MLS Player of the Week

MLS Goal of the Week

MLS Team of the Week

References 

Houston Dynamo FC seasons
Houston Dynamo
Houston Dynamo
Houston Dynamo